Sirera is a surname. Notable people with the surname include:

Daniel Sirera (born 1967), Spanish politician
Flors Sirera (1963–1997), Spanish nurse and aid worker